The Girls Next Door is an American reality television series  that originally aired on E!. The series focused on the lives of Hugh Hefner's then-girlfriends who lived with him at the Playboy Mansion. Hefner was often on the show along with various Playmates and other celebrities. It premiered on August 7, 2005, and ended on August 8, 2010, with a total of 91 episodes over the course of 6 seasons. The pilot episode was never aired on television but was later released on the season 1 DVD in 2006.

Series overview

Episodes

Pilot
The pilot episode, titled "Hef's World", was unaired on television, but was later released on the season 1 DVD in 2006.

Season 1 (2005)

Season 2 (2006)
Season 2 premiered on July 30, 2006. The first two episodes aired together as a special, on-hour version titled, "Happy Birthday, Hef".

Season 3 (2007)

Season 4 (2007–08)

Season 5 (2008–09)

Season 6 (2009–10)

References

External links
 

Girls Next Door